Amar Suloev (January 7, 1976 – June 27, 2016) was a Russian mixed martial artist.  Following his mixed martial arts career, Suloev became involved in the world of organized crime and was arrested and accused of being a contract killer. He died of stomach cancer in June 2016. During his career, he fought for the UFC, PRIDE Fighting Championships, Cage Rage, and M-1 Global.

Background
Suloev was born into a Yazidi-Kurdish family in Tashir, Armenian Soviet Socialist Republic (now Armenia).

Mixed martial arts career
A former kickboxer and Greco-Roman wrestler, Suloev was recruited by the Russian team Red Devil Sport Club and made his debut in national promotion M-1 Global in 1999, losing to Andrei Semenov by armbar. Suloev later avenged his defeat by choking out Semenov in Brazil for World Vale Tudo Championship, winning the WVC 11 Middleweight Tournament in the process.

Ultimate Fighting Championship
At UFC 35, Suloev came to fight in the premier MMA organization of the United States where he faced top light heavyweight Chuck Liddell. The fight went to decision, where Liddell was awarded the win on points. The fight was intense and Suloev demonstrated his level of skill with kickboxing as he avoided the trademark power shots of the feared American fighter. Despite the loss, Amar was one of only seven fighters to take Liddell to decision. The UFC invited him back at UFC 37 to fight Phil Baroni, where a controversial knee by Suloev was landed while Baroni was on his knees getting up, shortly after the referee stood them up, Baroni landed a flurry of punches which stopped Suloev.

PRIDE Fighting Championships
After a brief stint in the UFC, Suloev returned to M-1 Global for a few fights before jumping to the top Japanese MMA promotion Pride Fighting Championships. His first fight in Pride came against top Brazilian Jiu Jitsu ace Dean Lister, which ended in a decision win for Amar. His next fight came against another highly regarded jiu jitsu fighter Paulo Filho, however, in this fight, despite some aggression and relative success in striking on the feet, Filho proved to be the far better grappler, as he got a submission victory. Top Brazilian Top Team fighter, Murilo Bustamante faced Suloev in his next Pride appearance, and on this occasion, Suloev was able to largely keep the fight standing, where his strong kickboxing background guided him to a victory. In his final Pride fight, Denis Kang was his opponent, and much like the fight against Filho, Suloev was unsuccessful in avoiding the submission once the fight reached the canvas.

Personal life
He was charged as being a part of two assassinations and a third attempt in which a driver was killed. The alleged targets of the attempts were powerful Russian political figures. However, Suloev was never convicted of such things and there were serious problems with the state's case against him. One killer testified that Suloev had been the get away driver. But he did not match eyewitness descriptions of the driver (this in the failed assassination). Even more, his neighbor testified to meeting him on the morning of the attempt at his house at 9:05 am. The attempt occurred at about 9am hundreds of kilometers away. Some of the five other defendants involved in the case were Sergei Zirinov, a Krasnodar legislative assemblyman and member of president Vladimir Putin's "Unified Russia" Party.

At the time of his death, his trial had been suspended and he had been released on bail following his stage four stomach cancer diagnoses.

Championships and accomplishments
M-1 Global
2000 M-1 MFC World Championship Tournament Winner
2 Hot 2 Handle
2H2H 3: Hotter Than Hot Tournament Winner
World Vale Tudo Championship
WVC 11 Middleweight Tournament Winner

Mixed martial arts record

|-
| Win
| align=center|24–7
| Jacek Buczko
| TKO (kick and punches)
| M-1 Challenge 2: Russia
| 
| align=center| 1
| align=center| 0:56
| St. Petersburg, Russia
| 
|-
| Loss
| align=center| 23–7
| Chael Sonnen
| TKO (punches)
| BodogFIGHT: Alvarez vs. Lee
| 
| align=center| 2
| align=center| 3:33
| Trenton, New Jersey, United States
| 
|-
| Win
| align=center| 23–6
| Andy Foster
| KO (punches)
| BodogFIGHT: Clash of the Nations
| 
| align=center| 1
| align=center| 0:26
| St. Petersburg, Russia
| 
|-
| Win
| align=center| 22–6
| Hun Kim
| TKO (punches)
| M-1 MFC: Russia vs. Korea
| 
| align=center| 1
| align=center| 4:35
| St. Petersburg, Russia
| 
|-
| Loss
| align=center| 21–6
| Denis Kang
| Submission (one-arm strangle)
| PRIDE Bushido 12
| 
| align=center| 1
| align=center| 4:10
| Nagoya, Japan
| 
|-
| Win
| align=center| 21–5
| Murilo Bustamante
| Decision (unanimous)
| PRIDE Bushido 11
| 
| align=center| 2
| align=center| 5:00
| Saitama, Japan
| 
|-
| Win
| align=center| 20–5
| James Nicholl
| TKO (doctor stoppage)
| Cage Rage 16
| 
| align=center| 1
| align=center| 5:00
| London, United Kingdom
| 
|-
| Win
| align=center| 19–5
| Damien Riccio
| KO (knee)
| M-1 MFC: Russia vs. France
| 
| align=center| 1
| align=center| 1:25
| St. Petersburg, Russia
| 
|-
| Loss
| align=center| 18–5
| Paulo Filho
| Submission (armbar)
| PRIDE: Bushido 6
| 
| align=center| 1
| align=center| 4:22
| Yokohama, Japan
| 
|-
| Win
| align=center| 18–4
| Dean Lister
| Decision (split)
| PRIDE Bushido 4
| 
| align=center| 2
| align=center| 5:00
| Nagoya, Japan
| 
|-
| Win
| align=center| 17–4
| Din Thomas
| TKO (punches and soccer kicks)
| Inoki Bom-Ba-Ye 2003
| 
| align=center| 1
| align=center| 4:22
| Kobe, Japan
| 
|-
| Win
| align=center| 16–4
| Yushin Okami
| TKO (punches)
| M-1 MFC: Russia vs. the World 6
| 
| align=center| 1
| align=center| 4:44
| St. Petersburg, Russia
| 
|-
| Win
| align=center| 15–4
| Julian Gonzales
| Submission (rear-naked choke)
| M-1 MFC: Russia vs. the World 4
| 
| align=center| 1
| align=center| 1:38
| St. Petersburg, Russia
| 
|-
| Win
| align=center| 14–4
| Paul Cahoon
| Submission (Suloev stretch)
| 2H2H 5: Simply the Best
| 
| align=center| 1
| align=center| 1:03
| Rotterdam, Netherlands
| 
|-
| Loss
| align=center| 13–4
| Phil Baroni
| TKO (punches)
| UFC 37
| 
| align=center| 1
| align=center| 2:55
| Bossier City, Louisiana, United States
| 
|-
| Loss
| align=center| 13–3
| Chuck Liddell
| Decision (unanimous)
| UFC 35
| 
| align=center| 3
| align=center| 5:00
| Uncasville, Connecticut, United States
| 
|-
| Win
| align=center| 13–2
| Moise Rimbon
| TKO (punches)
| 2H2H 3: Hotter Than Hot
| 
| align=center| 2
| align=center| 4:48
| Rotterdam, Netherlands
| Won 2H2H 3: Hotter Than Hot Tournament.
|-
| Win
| align=center| 12–2
| Paul Cahoon
| Decision (2–0 points)
| 2H2H 3: Hotter Than Hot
| 
| align=center| 2
| align=center| 5:00
| Rotterdam, Netherlands
| 2H2H 3: Hotter Than Hot Tournament Semifinals.
|-
| Win
| align=center| 11–2
| Patrick de Witte
| Submission (armbar)
| 2H2H 3: Hotter Than Hot
| 
| align=center| 1
| align=center| 1:11
| Rotterdam, Netherlands
| 2H2H 3: Hotter Than Hot Tournament Quarterfinals.
|-
| Win
| align=center| 10–2
| Pedro Otavio
| KO (punches)
| M-1 MFC: Russia vs. the World 1
| 
| align=center| 1
| align=center| 3:40
| St. Petersburg, Russia
| 
|-
| Win
| align=center| 9–2
| Valentin Siouljine
| TKO (injury)
| Pancration Cup of Russia 1
| 
| align=center| 1
| align=center| 4:52
| St. Petersburg, Russia
| 
|-
| Win
| align=center| 8–2
| Alexander Mayorov
| TKO (strikes)
| PCR: Pancration Cup of Russia 1
| 
| align=center| 1
| align=center| 1:31
| St. Petersburg, Russia
| 
|-
| Win
| align=center| 7–2
| Vagam Bodjukyan
| Submission (choke)
| M-1 MFC: World Championship 2000
| 
| align=center| 2
| align=center| 2:51
| St. Petersburg, Russia
| Won M-1 MFC World Championship Tournament.
|-
| Win
| align=center| 6–2
| Rick Rootlieb
| Submission (choke)
| M-1 MFC: World Championship 2000
| 
| align=center| 3
| align=center| 0:31
| St. Petersburg, Russia
| M-1 MFC World Championship Tournament Semifinals.
|-
| Win
| align=center| 5–2
| Andrei Semenov
| Submission (rear-naked choke)
| World Vale Tudo Championship 11
| 
| align=center| 1
| align=center| 1:47
| Recife, Brazil
| Won WVC 11 Middleweight Tournament.
|-
| Win
| align=center| 4–2
| Alberto Prima
| Submission (kicks)
| World Vale Tudo Championship 11
| 
| align=center| 1
| align=center| 1:25
| Recife, Brazil
| WVC 11 Middleweight Tournament Semifinals.
|-
| Win
| align=center| 3–2
|  Luis Alberto
| KO (kick)
| WVC 11: World Vale Tudo Championship 11
| 
| align=center| 1
| align=center| 2:26
| Recife, Brazil
| WVC 11 Middleweight Tournament Quarterfinals.
|-
| Win
| align=center| 2–2
| Erik Oganov
| Submission (armbar)
| Pankration World Championship 2000 Day 1
| 
| align=center| 1
| align=center| 0:21
| Moscow, Russia
| 
|-
| Loss
| align=center| 1–2
| Darrel Gholar
| Decision
| PCNC: Pancration Cup of North Caucasus
| 
| align=center| 2
| align=center| 10:00
| St. Petersburg, Russia
| 
|-
| Win
| align=center| 1–1
| Sergei Yankovski
| Decision
| PCNC: Pancration Cup of North Caucasus
| 
| align=center| 2
| align=center| 10:00
| Rostov, Russia
| 
|-
| Loss
| align=center| 0–1
| Andrei Semenov
| Submission (armbar)
| M-1 MFC: World Championship 1999
| 
| align=center| 1
| align=center| 6:08
| St. Petersburg, Russia
| 1999 M-1 MFC Middleweight Tournament Semifinals.

References

External links

 

1976 births
2016 deaths
Armenian male mixed martial artists
Russian male mixed martial artists
Middleweight mixed martial artists
Mixed martial artists utilizing Muay Thai
Mixed martial artists utilizing sambo
Mixed martial artists utilizing judo
Mixed martial artists utilizing Greco-Roman wrestling
Armenian Muay Thai practitioners
Russian Muay Thai practitioners
Sportspeople from Tver
Armenian Yazidis
Russian Yazidis
Deaths from cancer in Russia
Ultimate Fighting Championship male fighters